Purple and Brown is a British stop-motion animated short television series made in collaboration with Nickelodeon and Aardman Animations, creators of Wallace and Gromit, Chicken Run, Creature Comforts, Angry Kid, Morph and Shaun the Sheep. The series was devised and directed by Rich Webber and edited by Mike Percival, who also offered the voices of the characters, and first aired in February 2006, on Nickelodeon's UK and Ireland channel, and then later became a staple on the US Nickelodeon network as part of its former Nick Extra short program.

Background
The series was devised and was directed by Webber and edited by Percival, who also offer the voices of the characters. The series was originally set to launch on 13 February 2006, on Nickelodeon's channel in the United Kingdom. Despite the series conclusion in 2007, its 7-minute special, titled Space was made back in 2009 but left unaired.

Purple and Brown is a creation of Aardman, who animated Wallace and Gromit, Creature Comforts, Angry Kid and Morph.

Storyline
The storyline is led by the characters of two clay blob friends, one is purple and the other brown, who get caught in ridiculous situations. Purple and Brown never speak, but they understand everything. Despite any given predicament, the duo can never help but giggle with a low, recognisable laugh.

Reception
In 2007, Cartoon Brew offered a mild criticism of Aardman's recent work, but wrote that Purple and Brown marked "a wonderful return to their roots", and that the concept is "beautifully animated and hilariously executed".

Episodes
 Snowman (2006) - 15 seconds
 Spaghetti (2006) - 19 seconds
 Weewee (2006) - 21 seconds
 Irish Jig (2006) - 54 seconds (shortened version), 2 minutes and 8 seconds (extended version)
 Seagull (2006) - 22 seconds
 Christmas (2006) - 59 seconds
 Speedy (2006) - 1 minute and 2 seconds
 Big Green Thing (2006) - 1 minute and 2 seconds
 Alien 2 (2006) – 11 seconds
 Magic Ball (2006)
 Beardly (2006) - 11 seconds
 Sleep (2006) - 1 minute and 2 seconds
 Balloon (2006) - 22 seconds
 Hammer (2007) - 11 seconds
 Beach Ball (2007) - 12 seconds
 Colour (2007) - 7 seconds
 Sun Screen (2007) - 9 seconds
 Paint (2007) - 11 seconds

Unused
 Mix Together
 Cheese Heads
 Fire Against Water
 Space

Awards
 2006, Won BAFTA award for best Children's Short

References

External links
 Purple and Brown at the Internet Movie Database

Aardman Animations
Television series by Aardman Animations
Fictional amorphous creatures
2005 British television series debuts
2008 British television series endings
British children's animated comedy television series
Clay animation television series
2000s British animated television series
Interstitial television shows
Animated television series without speech